Calathus may refer to:
Calathus (basket), a Greco-Roman basket or vase
Calathus (beetle), a genus of beetle